Lieutenant-Colonel Thomas Vesey, 3rd Viscount de Vesci and 4th Baron Knapton (21 September 1803 – 23 December 1875), was an Anglo-Irish peer and Conservative politician.

Background
de Vesci was the son of The 2nd Viscount de Vesci and Frances Letitia, daughter of William Brownlow.

Political career
The Honourable John Vesey, as he then was, sat as Member of Parliament for the Queen's County between 1835 and 1837 and 1841 and 1852. In October 1855, he succeeded his father to become The 3rd Viscount de Vesci. In 1857, as Lord de Vesci, he was elected an Irish Representative Peer and entered the House of Lords.

Marriage and progeny
In 1839, the future Lord de Vesci married Lady Emma Herbert (1819-October 1884), youngest daughter of The 11th Earl of Pembroke. She founded the Abbeyleix Baby Linen Society, a cooperative enabling women access to affordable baby clothing. By his wife he had progeny including:
John Vesey, 4th Viscount de Vesci, eldest son and heir.
Frances Isabella Catherine Vesey, who married The 4th Marquess of Bath
Beatrice Charlotte Elizabeth Vesey, who married The 1st Baron Stalbridge, a brother of The 1st Duke of Westminster.

Death and succession
Lord de Vesci died in December 1875, aged 72, and was succeeded by his son, John Vesey, 4th Viscount de Vesci.

References

External links

1803 births
1875 deaths
Viscounts in the Peerage of Ireland
Members of the Parliament of the United Kingdom for Queen's County constituencies (1801–1922)
UK MPs 1835–1837
UK MPs 1841–1847
UK MPs 1847–1852
UK MPs who inherited peerages
Irish representative peers
Presidents of the Oxford Union